Araeosoma thetidis is a species of sea urchin of the family Echinothuriidae. This species can be found in deep sea off Australia and New Zealand. A. thetidis was first scientifically described in 1909 by Hubert Lyman Clark.

References 

thetidis
Animals described in 1909